Douglas George Logan y Gonzales de Mendoza (born 1943) is an American sports executive.

He was the inaugural commissioner of Major League Soccer, and later served as the CEO of USA Track & Field.

Early life
Logan was born in New Jersey to an American father and Cuban mother.

He was studying civil engineering at Manhattan College when he was drafted into the military in 1964. He served with the 101st Airborne Division in Vietnam and was decorated with two Bronze Stars. He later studied at the University of Baltimore Law School, graduating in 1972.

Career

Early career
From 1986 to 1993, Logan was a senior vice president of Ogden Entertainment Services. He later became president and chief executive officer of Mexican entertainment company OCESA. Under his management, the Mexico Aztecas of the Continental Basketball Association became the first American professional sports franchise based in Mexico.

MLS Commissioner
In 1995, Logan was named the first commissioner of Major League Soccer, serving in that capacity through 1999. Sports Business Daily named Logan and the MLS staff Sports Industrialists of the Year for 1996. During Logan's last year at MLS, the league lost $34 million. MLS was reported to have lost $250 million in its first five years under Logan.

Later career
In 1999, Logan formed the sports consulting firm Empresario. In 2001, he was hired as a consultant in the creation of a professional National Rugby League, structuring the new league as a "single entity" system.

In 2008, Logan was appointed the CEO of USA Track & Field. In September 2010, the USATF Board announced it had fired Logan. Logan later filed a lawsuit for wrongful termination which was ultimately settled.

References

Living people
Manhattan College alumni
American chief executives of professional sports organizations
Major League Soccer executives
1943 births
United States Army personnel of the Vietnam War